Sanam Chai Road is a historic street in Bangkok's Phra Nakhon District. The Grand Palace, Wat Pho, Museum Siam, and Phra Ratchawang Police Station are located on the west side of the road, while on the east side are the Ministry of Defence headquarters, Saranrom Palace, Saranrom Park, the Territorial Defense Command headquarters and Wat Rajabopit School. Sanam Chai Station of the underground MRT's Blue Line is located beneath the road's final stretch.

The road is named after Sanam Chai ("field of prosperity"), a field formerly located in front of Saranrom Palace and used for military training. The field, together with Sanam Luang, was named by King Mongkut (Rama IV) in 1855, in order to follow the naming previously used in Ayutthaya. Sanam Chai is overlooked by the Grand Palace's Sutthaisawan Prasat Hall, which is used by the king for public appearances.

References

Streets in Bangkok
Phra Nakhon district